Mario Glory Rookantha Goonatillake (born 5 September 1959), is a Sri Lankan singer, musician and songwriter. One of the most influential musical artists in Sri Lanka, Rookantha started his career as a solo singer in late 1980s after few stints as a keyboard player. He frequently performs duets with his wife, Chandralekha Perera. His daughters Raini Charuka and Windy are both singers.

Rookantha is one of the most successful musicians in Sri Lankan pop and sentimental industry. He is known as the King of Pop amongst Sri Lankans. His albums have sold around 15,000 copies in Sri Lanka. He is known as the person who changed the Sri Lankan music industry in the 1980s with his songs.

Personal life 
Rookantha was born on 5 September 1959 in Kegalle, Sri Lanka to a middle-class family. He loved music from a very young age. As a result, his parents sent him to a music teacher nearby to teach him to play the piano. He attended St. Mary's College, Kegalle for primary education. He learned music at his school, St. Anthony's College, Kandy from great musicians such as Stanley Peiris and Cyril Brown. He also did G.C.E. A/Ls after coming to the music field.

Rookantha is married to singer and former actress Chandralekha Perera. They have two daughters, Raini Charuka (born 10 April 1991) and Windy (born 26 December).

Musical career
Rookantha once said in a radio interview that one of his music teachers at school was not that friendly and punished him several times for not using correct fingering in piano. Also, he found out that he was getting restricted to what the teacher wanted him to learn.

Rookantha originally pursued a career as a composer in 1976. In 1985, he found himself without a singer to provide vocals on one of his compositions, "Bambara Pahasa." THis 'Bambara Pahasa' cassette was released on October 31, 1988. He provided the vocals himself, beginning his career as a singer. His fourth album Charuka, named after his daughter, Raini Charuka, was released in 1997. He first composed the music for Jaliya Ranatunga's collection of 12 songs where he wrote two songs.

The exclusive concert of Rookantha and Chandralekha is 'Ru Sanda Rae' which means "Beauty Moon Night". The first concert was staged at the Elphinston Theatre in Colombo, Sri Lanka in February 1993. To-date it has been staged in many places around the globe including Italy, France, Denmark, Sweden, Germany, Australia, New Zealand, Canada, UK, USA, and the UAE. The 'Ru Sanda Rae' concert has been staged more than 300 times and still counting.

The mega show of 'Rookantha-Chandralekha Live at Stadium' was held in August 2009 at the Sugathadasa Indoor Stadium. Many crowds had to turn around as the tickets were sold out weeks before the concert overcrowding the Sugathadasa Stadium with over 15,000 people. Since then, the family has been traveling back and forth holding ‘Ru Sanda Rae’ concerts around the country. A special concert was held on the 11 August 2012 at 7.00 pm at the Sugathadasa Indoor Stadium, Colombo.

In 2019, he worked as a judge in the television reality show Hiru Star. However, he was assaulted by some group of people and damaged his vehicle by stating that Rookantha did not give his vote to a contestant.

Political harassment
On January 26, 2000, at around 9.00 pm, Rookantha and Chandralekha were raided by members of the former President Chandrika Kumaratunga's security forces, who cut off their hair. They had thrown petrol at the body, looted a jeep belonging to them, looted gold and other belongings and fled. The personnel were found guilty and the Panadura High Court sentenced them to four and a half years in prison. in 2013. One of the defendants, who was completely disabled, was given a lenient sentence. In 2014, Rookantha granted a presidential pardon to the defendants and later released by president Mahinda Rajapaksa. One person in Welikada Prison and eight others in Kalutara Prison were released on bail. 

After the incident, Goonatillake moved to the USA along with his family.

Political career
He returned Sri Lanka in 2018 with the intentions to enter into politics. In 2019, he was appointed as the Dambadeniya electorate organizer of the United National Party.

Singles

References

External links
 Musical Asylum
 Rookantha Songs Miyuru Gee Library
 රූකාන්ත – චන්ද්‍රලේඛා සරසවියට හෙළි කරයි

1959 births
Living people
Sri Lankan Roman Catholics
Sri Lankan singer-songwriters
20th-century Sri Lankan male singers
Alumni of St. Anthony's College, Kandy
Musicians from Kandy
Sinhalese singers